The Socialist Register is an annual socialist publication. It was founded in 1964 by Ralph Miliband and John Saville. They had criticisms of the New Left Review (NLR) after Perry Anderson became editor of the NLR in 1962. Miliband and Saville sought to bring about a journal in the orientation of The New Reasoner.

The Socialist Register is published in the US by Monthly Review Press, in Canada by Fernwood Publishing, and in the UK and rest of the world by Merlin Press. Its name is a reference to the Political Register, a 19th-century newspaper founded by radical journalist William Cobbett.

References

External links
Socialist Register website

Political magazines published in the United Kingdom
Annual magazines published in the United Kingdom
Magazines established in 1964
Socialist magazines
Magazines published in Wales